Casino Tournament of Champions is a video game developed by Random Programming and published by Capstone for MS-DOS.

Gameplay
Casino Tournament of Champions is a game featuring casino gambling games such as slots, video poker, blackjack, roulette, craps, minibaccarat, and well as seven versions of poker.

Reception
Next Generation reviewed the game, rating it three stars out of five, and stated that "if you're looking too add some casino action to your collection, CTOC is the package to buy - just don't expect anything spectacular."

Reviews
Electronic Games 1995-07
Computer Game Review And CD-ROM Entertainment - August 1995

References

External links

1995 video games
Casino video games
DOS games
DOS-only games
Video games developed in the United States